The Airbus CityAirbus is a multinational project by Airbus Helicopters to produce an electrically-powered VTOL personal air vehicle demonstrator. It is intended for the air taxi role, to avoid ground traffic congestion.

Development

The CityAirbus follows other Airbus Urban Air Mobility initiatives: Skyways to deliver packages by UAVs on the National University of Singapore campus, the A³ Vahana single-passenger, self-piloted VTOL aircraft and the A³ Voom on-demand shared helicopter booking service app by Airbus.

A 2015 feasibility study confirmed the design's operating costs and that it could meet safety requirements.
Full-scale testing of the ducted propeller drivetrain was completed in October 2017.
Type certification and commercial introduction are planned for 2023.

The iron bird systems test prototype was completed and powered on in December 2017 on a test bench in Taufkirchen, Germany, to test the propulsion system chain, flight controls and propeller dynamic loads, verifying the electric, mechanical and thermal dynamics before being installed on the flight demonstrator by mid-2018.

The first structural parts for the demonstrator were produced by Airbus Helicopters. The aircraft's first unmanned flight was on 3 May 2019. Manned flights have been planned for 2019. 31 August 2020 the CityAirbus demonstrator moved from Donauwörth to Manching near Ingolstadt / Munich, Bavaria.

The new configuration boasts a fixed wing, a V-tail, and eight electric propellers without moving surfaces or tilting parts.
First flight is planned for 2023 and certification is expected around 2025.

EASA is already working on a special condition VTOL (SC VTOL) means of compliance (MOC) to certify eVTOL aircraft. The final version of the MOC for eVTOLs will use newly developed Eurocae standards. The second flight control computer will be developed in collaboration with Diehl Aviation and Thales.

Design

The multirotor is intended to carry four passengers, with a pilot initially and to become self-piloted when regulations allow.
The overall system is being developed in Donauwörth, with the electrical propulsion system built in Ottobrunn/Munich.
The use of four ducted fans contribute to safety and low acoustic footprint.
The fully integrated drivetrain has eight propellers and eight  Siemens SP200D direct-drive electric motors.
The fixed pitch propellers are controlled by their RPM.
The four electric batteries total  and can produce a combined output four times . 

Specifications

See also
 List of aircraft
 Air taxi
 Airbus A³ Vahana
 Boeing Passenger Air Vehicle
 Urban air mobility

Related development
 Volocopter

References

External links
 
 
 
 

Airbus Helicopters aircraft
Electric aircraft
Electric helicopters
VTOL aircraft
Airbus
Airbus Helicopters
Prototypes
Proposed aircraft
Aircraft first flown in 2019
Urban air mobility
EVTOL aircraft